The Budker Institute of Nuclear Physics (BINP) is one of the major centres of advanced study of nuclear physics in Russia. It is located in the Siberian town Akademgorodok, on Academician Lavrentiev Avenue. The institute was founded by Gersh Budker in 1959. Following his death in 1977, the institute was renamed in honour of Academician Budker.

Despite its name, the centre was not involved either with military atomic science or nuclear reactors instead, its concentration was on high-energy physics (particularly plasma physics) and particle physics. In 1961 the institute began building VEP-1, the first particle accelerator in the Soviet Union which collided two beams of particles, just a few months after the ADA collider became operational at the Frascati National Laboratories in Italy in February 1961. The BINP now employs over 3000 people, and hosts several research groups and facilities.

Active facilities
VEPP-4 - e+e− collider for the energy range 2Ebeam up to 12 GeV
KEDR - detector for particle physics at VEPP-4
ROKK-1 - facility for experiments with high energy polarized gamma-ray beams at VEPP-4
VEPP-2000 - e+e− collider for the energy range 2Ebeam=0.4-2.0 GeV
SND - Spherical Neutral Detector for particle physics experiments at VEPP-2000
CMD-3 - Creogenic Magnetic Detector for particle physics experiments at VEPP-2000
Electron cooling experiments
Plasma physics experiments
GOL3 - long open plasma trap
GDL - gas-dynamic plasma trap
Siberian Synchrotron Radiation Centre
NovoFEL - Novosibirsk Free Electron Laser based on 4-turn ERL
BNCT – accelerator-based neutron source for boron neutron capture cancer therapy experiments

Participation in international projects 
From 1993 to 2001, BINP contributed toward the construction of CERN's Large Hadron Collider, providing equipment including beamline magnets.

Directors of the Institute
Gersh Budker (1959-1977)
Alexander N. Skrinsky (1977-2015)
Pavel V. Logatchov (2015-)

List of Scientists associated with this institute 
Arkady Vainshtein
Iosif Khriplovich

See also

List of accelerators in particle physics
List of synchrotron radiation facilities
Particle detector
Gas Dynamic Trap
Institute for Theoretical and Experimental Physics, another Russian particle physics laboratory in the vicinity of Moscow; located in Moscow proper
Institute for High Energy Physics, another Russian particle physics laboratory in the vicinity of Moscow; located south of Moscow
Joint Institute for Nuclear Research, international particle physics laboratory in the vicinity of Moscow; located north of Moscow

References

External links
Budker Institute's homepage
Alexandre Telnov's photographic history of the BINP

 
1959 establishments in the Soviet Union
Research institutes established in 1959
Nuclear research institutes in Russia
Nuclear research institutes
Institutes of the Russian Academy of Sciences
Research institutes in the Soviet Union
Particle physics facilities
Nuclear technology in the Soviet Union